MIKE 21 is a computer program that simulates flows, waves, sediments and ecology in rivers, lakes, estuaries, bays, coastal areas and seas in two dimensions. It was developed by DHI.

Simulation engines
MIKE 21 comprises three simulation engines: 

Single Grid: the -dependent non-linear equations of continuity and conservation of momentum are solved by implicit finite difference techniques with the variables defined on a space-staggered rectangular grid.

Multiple Grids: the Multiple Grids version uses the same simulation engine and numerical approach as the single grid version. However, it provides the possibility of refining areas of special interest within the model area (nesting). All domains within the model area are dynamically linked. 

Flexible Mesh: is an unstructured mesh and uses a cell-centred finite volume solution technique. The mesh is based on linear triangular elements.

Applications
MIKE 21 can be used for design data assessment for coastal and offshore structures, optimization of port layout and coastal protection measures, cooling water, desalination and recirculation analysis, environmental impact assessment of marine infrastructures, water forecast for safe marine operations and navigation, coastal flooding and storm surge warnings, inland flooding and overland flow modeling.

Integrated hydrologic modelling
Hydraulic engineering
Environmental engineering
Physical geography